Manduca camposi is a moth of the  family Sphingidae. It is known from Ecuador.

References

Manduca
Moths described in 1933